Ehlers Knob is a small but conspicuous ice-covered knob which surmounts the western part of the north coast of Dustin Island, Antarctica. The knob was photographed from helicopters of the Burton Island and the Glacier on the US Navy Bellingshausen Sea Expedition in February 1960. It was visited and surveyed by a party from the Glacier in February 1961, and was named by the Advisory Committee on Antarctic Names for Robert C. Ehlers, a field assistant at Byrd Station, 1966–67.

References 

Hills of Ellsworth Land